David Lienemann (born ) is an American photographer. He was the official White House photographer for Joe Biden during the eight years that he served as Vice President of the United States. In the course of his role, Lienemann took nearly one million photographs.

Education and career 
Lienemann graduated from Cornell College with a BA in both economics and business in 2005. Prior to coming to work at the White House, Lienemann covered the 2008 United States presidential race for clients such as The New York Times, Chicago Tribune, Associated Press and Getty Images.

Lienemann published a book of his photographs titled Biden: The Obama Years and the Battle for the Soul of America in 2020. In her foreword to the book, Biden's wife Jill Biden writes that "As David seamlessly wove himself into the day-to-day of Joe’s life, he became something more than just a photographer — he became one of Joe’s most honest advisers. Our friend."

Personal life and awards 
Lienemann is based in New Mexico with his wife Sydney and daughter Millie.

In 2015 he received the Young Alumni Achievement Award from Cornell College.

Gallery

See also 

 Chief Official White House Photographer
 Pete Souza (former official photographer for Presidents Ronald Reagan and Barack Obama)

References

External links 

 

American photographers
White House photographers
American photojournalists
Obama administration personnel
Year of birth missing (living people)
Living people